Gartler is a surname. Notable people with the surname include:

Paul Gartler (born 1997), Austrian footballer
René Gartler (born 1985), Austrian footballer and coach
Stanley Michael Gartler (born 1923), American cell and molecular biologist and human geneticist